The Beach 90th Street station (signed as Beach 90th Street–Holland station) is a station on the IND Rockaway Line of the New York City Subway. It is served by the Rockaway Park Shuttle at all times and ten daily rush-hour only A trains.

History
The "Holland" designation refers to Michael P. Holland, one of the early developers of the area in which the station was located. It was originally built by the Long Island Rail Road at Holland Avenue and Beach 92nd Street between May and June 1880 along the Rockaway Beach Branch for the nearby Holland Hotel, and was also a trolley stop of the Ocean Electric Railway. It was rebuilt in 1899, and again in 1914 with a baggage storage facility. Like much of the Rockaway Beach Branch and part of the former Far Rockaway Branch, it was closed in 1941 and rebuilt as an elevated station in 1942, only to be purchased by the New York City Transit Authority on October 3, 1955 and reopened as a subway station on June 28, 1956.

After Hurricane Sandy hit and destroyed the long stretch of the IND Rockaway Line, this was a terminal of the temporary  shuttle until May 30, 2013, when the A train and the Rockaway Park Shuttle were restored to the Rockaways. H trains terminated on the northbound track, because the Rockaway Park Shuttle was not in operation and A service was cut to Howard Beach–JFK Airport.

Station layout

The station is built on a concrete viaduct. There are two tracks and two side platforms. New lights were installed in 2010.

Exits
There is a crossunder to the tiled mezzanine.  Outside of fare control, there are stairs to either eastern corner of Rockaway Freeway and Beach 90th Street. The southbound side had an additional exit on the south end, which has been removed.

References

External links 
 
 
 Station Reporter — Rockaway Park Shuttle
 1905 Image of Holland Station (Arrt's Arrchives)
 The Subway Nut — Beach 90th Street – Holland Pictures 
 Beach 90 Street entrance from Google Maps Street View
 Platform level from Google Maps Street View

IND Rockaway Line stations
New York City Subway stations in Queens, New York
Railway stations in the United States opened in 1956
1956 establishments in New York City